Jonas Leandersson (born 22 January 1990) is a Swedish orienteering competitor. He won a gold medal in the sprint at the 2012 European Orienteering Championships in Falun. Gold at the 2014 European Orienteering Championships in relay and gold at the 2014 World Orienteering Championships relay competing with the same relay team.

He competed at the 2012 World Orienteering Championships. In the sprint competition he qualified for the final, where he placed 15th. At the 2018 World Orienteering Championships in Latvia he won a gold medal in the mixed sprint relay, together with Karolin Ohlsson, Emil Svensk and Tove Alexandersson.

Results

World Championship results

World Cup victories

References

External links

Living people
Swedish orienteers
Male orienteers
Foot orienteers
World Orienteering Championships medalists
1990 births